Five Leaf Clover (French: Le trèfle à cinq feuilles) is a 1972 French comedy film directed by Edmond Freess and starring Philippe Noiret, Liselotte Pulver and Micha Bayard.

Cast
 Philippe Noiret as Alfred  
 Liselotte Pulver as Daisy  
 Micha Bayard as Germaine Constant  
 Maurice Biraud as Georges-André Constant  
 Jean Carmet as Lord Picratt  
 Jean-Roger Caussimon as Vampirus  
 Barbara Cederlung as Isabelle  
 Monique Chaumette as Marie-Berthe  
 Pierre Fabre as Ferdinand  
 Thalie Frugès as Chloë  
 Corinne Koeningswarter as Isalaide  
 Bernard La Jarrige 
 Ginette Leclerc as L'épicière  
 Paul Préboist as Léon Constant

References

Bibliography 
 Hans-Michael Bock and Tim Bergfelder. The Concise Cinegraph: An Encyclopedia of German Cinema. Berghahn Books.

External links 
 

1972 films
French comedy films
1972 comedy films
1970s French-language films
1970s French films